Qaziabad (also Romanized as Qāẕīābād) is a village in Mojezat Rural District, in the Central District of Zanjan County, Zanjan Province, Iran. At the 2006 census, its population was 70, in 19 families.

References 

Populated places in Zanjan County